Tarapur is a census town in Palghar district (earlier Palghar was taluka and has recently notified as district) in the Indian state of Maharashtra. It is an industrial town located some 45 km north of Virar, on the Western

Railway line of Mumbai Suburban Division (Mumbai Suburban Railway). Tarapur can be reached from Boisar, the nearest railway station. It is 20 km off National Highway NH-8.

History 

At the end of the thirteenth century (1280), Tarapur is mentioned as one of the towns conquered from the Naiks by Bhim the legendary ruler of Mahim in Bombay island. (Naime's Konkan, 22.) In 1533 it was burnt by the Portuguese. (De Barros, VII. 501; Faria in Kerr, VI. 223, 225.) In 1556 the Portuguese possessions near Tarapur were greatly increased, and it was the head of the richest of the Daman districts. (De Couto, VIII. 208.) In 1559 an assault by some Abyssinian troops was successfully beaten off. (De Couto, VIII. 208.) In 1582, and again in 1612, the fort was unsuccessfully attacked by the Moghals. (De Couto, XI. 195; Mickle's Lusiad, ociii.) In 1634 the town was the seat of a magistrate with powers over half of the Daman territories. It exported provisions in which the country round was rich, and had a good trade with Surat and Diu. (O Chron. de Tis. III. 199.) The fort was surrounded by a wall with round bastions, and, besides quarters for the garrison, had a church, a Dominican monastery, and a hospital or misericordia. The garrison included a captain, a naik, ten peons, and a bombardier, a police inspector and four peons, an interpreter, a writer, a torchbearer, and an umbrella boy. Besides the garrison there was the vicar, and fifty Portuguese, 200 Native Christians, and about 100 slaves, good fighters and well armed with swords, lances, and guns. [O Chron. de Tis. III. 199.] In 1670 Ogilby mentions it as a coast town, (O gilby's Atlas, V. 208.) and, in 1695, Gemelli Careri describes it as well inhabited with monasteries of the Dominicans and Franciscans of the Recolet school. (Churchill, IV. 190.) In 1728 it Was said to be of no strength and to be garrisoned by sixty soldiers. [O. Chron. de Tis. I. 35.] In 1739 the fort was attacked by the Marathas under Chimaji Appa. Four mines were laid, of which two succeeded in making great breaches in a bastion and curtain. Bajibevrav, Ramchandra Hari, Yeshvant Pavar, and Tukaji Pavar rushed into the breaches with their colours. They were stoutly opposed by the Portuguese, and success was doubtful, till Ranoji Bhonsle scaled the wall in another part and divided the attention of the garrison. Still, as Chimnaji wrote, they fought with the courage of Europeans, till, at last overpowered, the survivors asked for and were granted quarter. [Grant Duff's Marathas, 241; Thornton's Gazetteer, 959-60.] In 1750 Tieffenthaler mentions Tarapur as a place once Portuguese now Maratha. [Res. Hist, et Geog. de l'Inde, I. 407.] After the capture the Marathas repaired the sea face of the fort in European style. In 1760 it was in good order and protected by four guns. [Anquetil du Perron's Zend A vests, occlxxxi.] In 1776 Raghunathrav took shelter in the fort. [Grant Duff's Marathas, 398.] In 1803 it passed to the British without resistance. In 1818 it was described by Captain Dickinson as one of the largest, best conditioned, and most central of the sea-coast forts in the north Konkan. The walls, most of which were of cut stone, enclosed a space 500 feet square. They were about thirty feet high and ten thick, except the parapet which was seldom more than four feet wide. The north face was washed by the sea at spring tides, and in many places was out of repair. Long stretches of the parapet had fallen, and, at the south-east angle of the fort, there was neither tower nor bastion. On three sides were remains of a dry ditch of inconsiderable width and depth. In the middle of the eastern face was the principal gateway, uncovered by traverse or any sort of outwork. Inside the fort were some large ruins and several buildings four of them private. There were besides two granaries and a guard-room, with some inferior buildings and several wells containing abundant and excellent water. As in Dahanu fort, houses and gardens came within 150 feet of the works. In 1862 it was in a ruined state, part of the north wall having fallen. In the fort were some wells and gardens. The fort was given in inam by the Peshwa to Vikaji Mehrji, for a hundred years, and is still held by his heirs. Taylor mentions, on the south bank of the creek, the remains of a Portuguese fort which was built in 1593. [Taylor's Sailing Directory, 372.]

Chinchani town on the north side of the creek has a customs-house and traveller's bungalow now used as school. On the beach, about a mile north of Tarapur, is a ruined brick tower, which, in 1818, Captain Dickinson found twenty-two feet high with a mean diameter of twenty-eight feet. The lower or main battery was nine feet above ground and contained five guns, the side parapet walls not exceeding three and a half feet in thickness. Over this battery was another, suited for an equal number of guns. Its parapet wall supported a wretched roof, and was not more than a foot and a half thick.

Today its one of the biggest industrial hub near Mumbai. Regarding sea transport now its possible for barge to arrive near Satpati-Murbe jetty. GR Engineering Pvt. Ltd. had transport 70 mtrs cargo by this jetty.

Geography 

It has an average elevation of 10 metres (33feet).

Economy

Atomic power stations

The Tarapur nuclear power station houses two boiling water reactors (BWRs), each of 200 MW (De-rated to 160MW), the first in Asia, and a recent unit with two pressurised heavy water reactors each of 540 MW. This PHWR based power station is not only the largest nuclear power reactor in the country but also the largest power unit in India. It was commissioned seven months ahead of schedule, at a cost much lower than the original estimate, by the Nuclear Power Corporation of India.

Tarapur Atomic Power Station (320 MW) (T.A.P.S.) was constructed by the American companies Bechtel and GE near village Akkarpatti. The new reactors (1080 MW) were constructed by Larsen & Toubro and Gammon India. Both these power stations are operated by Nuclear Power Corporation of India Limited. The personnel operating the power plant live in a residential complex called T. A. P. S. Township. This residential complex is a fifteen-minute drive from Boisar, the nearest railway station. The residential complex was also constructed by Bechtel to house both Indian and American employees. Because it was the home to American engineers and technicians, the residential complex had a very American small-town look, with neat sidewalks, spacious houses, a club with tennis courts, gyms and swimming pool, a commissary etc. While the original American residents have long gone, the colony continues to thrive.

Industrial estate
Tarapur also houses two huge industrial estates Maharashtra Industrial Development Corporation, Tarapur Industrial Estate and Additional Tarapur Industrial Estate), which include bulk drug manufacturing units, specialty chemical manufacturing units like JSW Steel Ltd, Aarti Industries plants and a few textile plants.

Gas-fired power station
MIDC has proposed a gas-fired power station for captive use at Tarapur Industrial Area. MIDC has decided to explore the concept of group captive power plant (GCPP) as proposed in the Electricity Act of 2003. Subsequently, MIDC appointed PricewaterhouseCoopers as consultant to study the concept of GCPPs.

Planning and layout
Unlike other industrial estates, this industrial estate has a pleasant look due to the roads crossing at right angles and many small gardens adjacent to the boundary walls of the industrial units. The location near Mumbai Port/Mumbai Harbour (MbPT) and JNPT as well as proximity to Trans Thane Creek (TTC) MIDC, Vapi GIDC add a great value to this industrial estate. It is located on the most important rail-route, Mumbai to Delhi and the Mumbai-Ahmedabad Highway, a part of the Golden Quadrilateral project.

Environment
The first "Common Effluent Treatment Plant" (CETP) in Maharashtra came up at Tarapur. Tarapur Industrial Manufacturers' Association is responsible for planting saplings.
Tarapur, according to the central pollution control board, emerged as the most polluted industrial cluster.

Tarapur is spread across a number of villages. The location  comprises excellent schools, hospitals, multiple shopping complexes, hotels and restaurants, and is well connected to Mumbai through road and rail. The main shopping areas are Chitralaya and Boisar (oswal, Yashvant shristi), which have a huge number of small and big  shops.

Demographics 
 India census, Tarapur had a population of 7012.  Males constitute 50% of the population and females 50%. Tarapur has a literacy rate of 91% for both males and females, much higher than the national average of 72%.  In Tarapur, 11% of the population is under 6 years of age.

Among minority languages, Gujarati is spoken by 15.68% of the population and Hindi by 26.78%.

Education 
 Tarapur Vidya Mandir & Jr. College
 R.H.SAVE VIDYALAYA

Attractions 
Two beaches lay about four kilometres west from Tarapur. Well known is the Tarapur beach with a dilapidated Portuguese fort which was in a ruined state in 1862, part of the north wall having fallen. The Tarapur Fort, with wells and gardens within, was given in inam (a grant of real estate) by the Peshwa to Vikaji Mehrji, for a hundred years, and is still held by his heirs, and is currently in custody of Chorge family. Another beautiful site is the Chinchani beach, one and a half kilometres north of the fort.

Transport 
Rented cars/taxis, state transport buses (Maharashtra State Transport Corporation) and auto rickshaws are the general mode of transport.

Transport history 
Tarapur, a port in the Mahim sub-division, had a population of 2939 in 1881. It lies in a low wooded tract on the south bank of the Tarapur creek, sixty miles north of Bombay, fifteen miles north of Mahim, and road seven miles north-west of the Boisar station of the Baroda railway. The road from Boisar station was built in 1871 at a cost of £14,536 (Rs. 1,45,365). The traffic at Boisar station show an increase in passengers from 11,711 in 1873 to 24,329 in 1880, and in goods from 1289 to 3302 tons. From the village on the north bank of the creek the town is known by the joint name of Tarapur-Chinchni.

Ship transport 
In 1634 the bar of the Tarapur river was described as of the same width as the Dahanu bar, with a similar sand bank at the mouth and a channel in the middle which was dry at low tide, but at high water allowed a ship to enter and anchor. Within a rocky reef, to the north-west of the town, there is still anchorage for small craft. But particularly in the south, the bottom is full of rocks and shoals, which stretch from Tarapur point to the north-west and north abreast the town.  Between Tarapur and Bombay the tides set nearly in the direction of the land, the flood a little towards it or north, and the ebb a little from it about south by west.

In the 1881 population of 2939, there were 2124 Hindus, 397 Musalmans, 366 Parsis, and 52 Christians. The sea-trade returns for the five years ending 1878-79 show average exports worth £10,529 (Rs. 1,05,290) and average imports worth £6134 (Rs. 61,340). Exports varied from £1115 (Rs. 11,150) in 1877-78 to £16,840 (Rs. 1,68,400) in 1878-79, and imports from £4690 (Rs. 46,900) in 1878-79 to £7220 (Rs. 72,200) in 1876-77. [The details are: Exports, 1874-75 £14,031 (Rs. 1,40,310), 1875-76 £11,828 (Rs. 1,18,280), 1876-77 £8835 (Rs. 88,350), 1877-78 £1115 (Rs. 11,150?), 1878-79 £16,840 (Rs.1,68,400); Imports, 1874-75 £5370 (Rs. 53,700), 1875-76 £6694(Rs. 66,940), 1876-77 £7220 (Rs. 72,200), 1877-78 £6696 (Rs. 66,960), 1878-79 £4690 (Rs. 46,900).] A municipality was sanctioned in 1866, but the sanction was withdrawn in 1869. There is a Government school and a school founded by the Bombay Parsi Panchayat for teaching Zend Avesta. In the Parsi quarter of the town is a fire-temple, built about 1820 by the well-known Parsi contractor Vikaji Mehrji. Opposite to the fire-temple is Vikaji Mehrji's mansion, a large two-storied building visible for miles. About two miles to the south there are three Towers of Silence. The earliest of unknown date is built of undressed stones and mortar. Another of unknown date was built by public subscription; and the third, now in use, was built in 1866 also by public subscription. [Mr. B. B. Patel.]

Nearby towns 
 Boisar 
 Chinchani
 Vangaon
 Umroli
 Palghar
 Dahanu Road

See also
Tarapore

References 

Cities and towns in Palghar district
Company towns in India